Pagani (('e) Pavane in ) is a town and comune in Campania, Italy, administratively part of the Province of Salerno, in the region known as the Agro Nocerino Sarnese. Pagani has a population of 35,834, as of 2016.

History
In the period before the Roman supremacy in southern Italy, it was included into the territory of Nuceria, the chief town in the valley of the Sarnus, Herculaneum, Pompeii, Stabiae and Surrentum all being dependent upon it, according to many archaeologists.
It maintained its allegiance to Rome till 309 BC when it joined the revolted Samnites.
In 308 BC it repulsed a Roman attempt to land at the mouth of the Sarnus, but in 307 BC it was besieged and surrendered. It obtained favourable terms, and remained faithful to Rome even after Cannae.

Hannibal reduced it in 216 BC by starvation, and destroyed the town of Nuceria. The inhabitants returned when peace was restored. Even during the Social War it remained true to Rome. In 73 BC it was plundered by Spartacus.

In the Middle Ages (around the 9th century) a small colony of Saracens was actually introduced in the town by permission of the Dukes of Naples, but it lasted only a few decades.

It was united to Nocera Inferiore, and it took the name of Nuceria Paganorum, by the Paganos, a noble family living in the castle of Curtis in Plano (the family could have taken this surname from the pagans/Saracens who previously inhabited the area), in the nowadays Pagani.

Churches and religion
Pagani is home to some well-known churches and basilica, including:

The Shrine of Saint Mary the Crowned of Mount Carmel, commonly known as the Shrine of Our Lady of the Hens. This Marian shrine hosts the annual Feast of Our Lady of the Hens. During this week, people dance in the streets to the tammurriata (or tarantella).

Sports
The town is home to the Italian third-division Serie C football club, Paganese Calcio 1926, whose home ground is the 6,000-seat Stadio Marcello Torre.

See also
Daughters of Charity of the Most Precious Blood

References

External links

Cities and towns in Campania
Arabs in Italy